Maritz may refer to:
 Paul Maritz, American businessman
 Gerrit Maritz, prominent Dutch Voortrekker
 Laurette Maritz, South African professional golfer
 Noelle Maritz, Swiss footballer
 Maritz Rebellion, aka Boer Revolt or the Five-Shilling Rebellion, occurred in South Africa in 1914 
 Maritz, sales and marketing services company.